The Sound of Love is a 1977 Australian television film directed by John Power and starring John Jarratt and George Ogilvie. Its plot concerns a deaf mechanic who falls in love with a mute girl.

References

External links
Sound of Love at Peter Malone

The Sound of Love at Oz Movies 

Australian television films
1977 television films
1977 films
1970s English-language films
Films directed by John Power
1970s Australian films